The Mashpee River is a  tidal river on Cape Cod in Mashpee, Massachusetts.

The river arises in Mashpee and Wakeby Ponds, flows south a short distance, and drains into Pirate's Cove on Popponesset Bay on the Nantucket Sound. Conservation efforts began in 1915 or earlier, and much of the surrounding region is now part of the Mashpee River Reservation owned and conserved by the nonprofit Trustees of Reservations.

References 

 The Trustees of Reservations: Mashpee River Reservation

Rivers of Barnstable County, Massachusetts
Rivers of Massachusetts